Colutea is a genus of about 25 species of deciduous flowering shrubs in the legume family Fabaceae, growing from 2–5 m tall, native to southern Europe, north Africa and southwest Asia. The leaves are pinnate and light green to glaucous grey-green. The flowers are yellow to orange, pea-shaped and produced in racemes throughout the summer. These are followed by the attractive inflated seed pods which change from pale green to red or copper in colour.

Colutea arborescens, known as Bladder Senna—John Gerard cautioned, however, that they are not true senna, "though we have followed others in giving it to name Bastard Sena, which name is very unproper to it"—is indigenous to the Mediterranean; it has yellow flowers. It has a height and spread of up to 5 m. Other species include Colutea orientalis, with grey leaves and coppery flowers.

Cultivation and uses
Colutea arborescens, is in general cultivation in the UK. It was imported early, before 1568, probably for medicinal purposes, but now is grown mostly for its attractive seed pods., used in dried arrangements. Though in Virginia Thomas Jefferson had it and it appears in Lady Jean Skipwith's lists of plants, in US gardens, it is little more than a marginal curiosity.

Colutea arborescens will grow in poor sandy soils in preference to heavy or loamy soils. It has become naturalised in the UK, where it established itself in the sharp drainage of railway embankments.  It is easy to propagate from seed. It is generally pest resistant, though garden snails will climb up the plant in wet weather to eat the leaves. The hybrid Colutea × media (C. arborescens × C. orientalis) is also cultivated for its coppery flowers.

Colutea species are used as food plants by the larvae of some Lepidoptera species including Coleophora colutella. The Bedouins of the Sinai and Negev would, in times of scarcity, eat the seeds of Colutea istria.

References

The New RHS Dictionary of Gardening ed. A. Huxley, 1992.

Galegeae
Fabaceae genera